The Schweizerische Wagons- und Aufzügefabrik AG (SWS, Swiss Railcar and Lift Factory Corporation, known colloquially as "Wagi"), which was based at Schlieren in the Canton of Zürich, Switzerland, was a manufacturer of railway rolling stock and lifts.

The company was founded in 1895 as Firma Geissberger & Cie., which opened a wagon factory at Schlieren railway station. In 1899, the company became Schweizerische Wagen- und Wagons-Fabrik AG, based in Zürich.  Just one year later, the company moved its base back to Schlieren, and in 1901, there was another renaming, to Schweizerische Wagons-Fabrik AG in Schlieren-Zürich (SWS).

In 1903, the newly formed Swiss Federal Railways (SBB-CFF-FFS) ordered passenger cars from SWS.  As early as 1906, the 1,000th item of rolling stock left the SWS workshop, and in 1909 the 2,000th vehicle was delivered to SBB-CFF-FFS.

In 1917, SWS took over the lift manufacturing business from the firm Aufzüge- und Räderfabrik Seebach AG and in 1928 the firm name was changed to Schweizerische Wagons- und Aufzügefabrik AG, Schlieren-Zürich.

In 1956 it was announced that Pars Finanz AG – the then holding company of the Schindler Group, which was involved in lift manufacturing and wagon building – had purchased 30% of SWS's share capital. In 1958, Schlieren installed the fastest lift at the time - with speed of 5 m/s (20 ft/s), in Atomium building in Brussels, the capital of Belgium. The Schindler Group took the "Wagi" over completely in 1960, and integrated the company into the group as a subsidiary company.

When the Swiss rolling stock manufacturing industry was restructured in 1980–1981, SWS changed its rolling stock specialisation to component manufacturing, as well as alterations and revisions. In lift manufacture, the company focused on standard doors and standard cabins. In 1983, Schindler Group announced that SWS would be closed. At the end of August 1985, the closure took place, amidst vehement protests by employees and the public.

At the former premises of SWS, which were demolished very soon afterwards, a large new building was constructed, to house a new printing works for the Neue Zürcher Zeitung (NZZ). Other new buildings constructed on the site were, for the most part, taken up by new small businesses.

Schindler continues to manufacture lifts today, and is the core product of that company, along with escalators and moving walkways. Railway division was divested in 1997 and acquired by Stadler Rail.

References

External links 
 WAGI Museum Website
 Official Heritage Website
 bahnarchiv.ch – Image database with partial SWS- photo archive

This article was translated from the German-language version as at August 2010.

Defunct manufacturing companies of Switzerland
Rolling stock manufacturers of Switzerland
Tram manufacturers
Elevator manufacturers
Escalator manufacturers
Electric vehicle manufacturers of Switzerland
Companies based in the canton of Zürich